Rivalry in Dixie is the name given to the Louisiana Tech–Southern Miss football rivalry. It is a college football rivalry game between the Louisiana Tech Bulldogs and Southern Miss Golden Eagles.

History
Louisiana Tech won the first game of the series 27–0 on November 28, 1935. La Tech and USM were conference foes in the Southern Intercollegiate Athletic Association from 1935 to 1941. In addition, La Tech and USM were both founding members of the Gulf States Conference, which began play in 1948. The two football programs competed against each other every season from 1946 to 1972.

The Bulldogs and Golden Eagles played 11 times from 1975 to 1992. The name of the rivalry was coined by Mississippi Southern alumnus and Louisiana Tech head football coach Maxie Lambright. Following the Bulldogs' 23–22 victory over the Golden Eagles in 1976, Lambright declared, "This is the finest rivalry in Dixie." Thereafter, the event became known as "Rivalry in Dixie."

The word "Dixie" refers to privately issued currency from banks in Louisiana. These banks issued ten-dollar notes, labeled "Dix", French for "ten", on the reverse side. The notes were known as "Dixies" by English-speaking southerners, and the area around New Orleans and the French-speaking parts of Louisiana came to be known as "Dixieland". Eventually, usage of the term broadened to refer to most of the Southern United States.

Southern Miss is known for the "World-Famous Dixie Darlings." The USM dance team was established in 1954 as the Dixie Maids. However, after only one week of existence, the band director Dr. Raymond Mannoni decided to change their name to the Dixie Darlings after a Mobile reporter remarked "Look at those delightful darlings of Dixie" after seeing the Dixie Darlings perform. The Dixie Darlings debuted at the Mississippi Southern vs. Alabama game in Montgomery on September 17, 1954. Since then, the Dixie Darlings have become a fixture at Golden Eagle football games. In addition, the Pride of Mississippi Marching Band plays "Are You from Dixie?" following the extra point attempt following a Golden Eagle touchdown.

The historic Dixie Theatre is a landmark in the heart of downtown Ruston, Louisiana. The theater was built in 1928 as the Astor Theater and showed films and presented concerts. The theater was renamed in 1932 as the Rialto and become the Dixie Theatre in the 1950s after being purchased by the Dixie Theater Corporation of New Orleans. The famous flashing star crowning the marquee was added in 1956. In 1996, the Dixie Center of the Arts was established to reinstate the Dixie Theatre as a center for entertainment and the arts in downtown Ruston as it hosts full seasons of events, parties, and concerts.

In 2008, La Tech athletics director and head football coach Derek Dooley and USM athletics director Richard Giannini signed a four-game contract to renew the rivalry. Giannini stated, "We look forward to renewing our series with Louisiana Tech, one of our oldest rivalries in terms of games, and a quality opponent in the Western Athletic Conference." In 2010, Southern Miss won the first game of the renewed series, 13–12 on a rainy night in Ruston. The two teams opened their 2011 season in Hattiesburg in spite of heavy rain and high winds from Tropical Storm Lee on Saturday, September 3, 2011 on Fox Sports Net. Southern Miss won a nail-biter 19–17 thanks to a last minute field goal by Danny Hrapmann.

With Louisiana Tech's move to Conference USA in 2013, Rivalry in Dixie is once again a conference rivalry. Currently, Southern Miss leads the series 36–17 over Louisiana Tech.

On October 26, 2021, USM announced they were leaving Conference USA for the Sun Belt Conference. While the game will no longer be a conference rivalry, future matchups have been scheduled; at Louisiana Tech in 2025 and at Southern Miss in 2026.

Game results

See also  
 List of NCAA college football rivalry games

References

College football rivalries in the United States
Louisiana Tech Bulldogs football
Southern Miss Golden Eagles football